John Stanwix (born about 1690, England; died at sea, 29 October 1766) was a British soldier and politician.

Background
He was born John Roos, the son of Rev. John Roos, rector of Widmerpool, Nottinghamshire. In 1725 he succeeded to the estates of his uncle Thomas Stanwix MP and adopted the name of Stanwix.

Stanwix entered the army in 1706, rose to a captain of the grenadiers in 1739, major of marines in 1741, and lieutenant-colonel in 1745, and was appointed equerry to Frederick, Prince of Wales, in 1749. In 1750, he was appointed Governor of Carlisle, and also represented the town in the British parliament as the Member of Parliament for Carlisle (1741–42 and 1746–61).

In 1754 he became deputy quartermaster-general of the forces, and on 1 January 1756 he was made colonel-commandant of the 1st battalion of the 60th or Royal American Regiment. On his arrival in America he was given the command of the southern district. During 1757 his headquarters were at Carlisle, Pennsylvania, and he was appointed brigadier-general on 27 December of that year. 

After his relief by General John Forbes in 1758, General Stanwix went to Albany, New York, whence he was ordered to the Oneida carrying-place, to secure that important position by the erection of a work which was called Fort Stanwix in his honor. This was later the location of the signing of the Treaty of Fort Stanwix in 1768. In 1759 Stanwix returned to Pennsylvania, built and named Fort Pitt, and surmounted the works with cannon. He worked with George Croghan, the deputy superintendent of Indian affairs, to secure the good will of the Indians.

Final years and disappearance
On 19 June 1759, Stanwix was appointed major-general, but he was relieved by General Robert Monckton on 4 May 1760, and became lieutenant-general on 19 January 1761. After his return to England he was appointed lieutenant-governor of the Isle of Wight and made colonel successively of the 49th Regiment of Foot (1761–1764) and the 8th (The King's) Regiment of Foot (1764–1766).

He was also Member of Parliament for Appleby in Westmorland from 1761 to 1766.

He was lost at sea while crossing from Dublin, Ireland, to Holyhead, Wales, in a packet boat The Eagle.

See also
Carlisle (UK Parliament constituency)
List of people who disappeared mysteriously at sea

External links
John Stanwix at the Probert Encyclopedia
John Brooke, STANWIX, John (1693-1766), of Carlisle, Cumb. at The History of Parliament
Romney R. Sedgwick, STANWIX, John (1693-1766), of Carlisle, Cumb. at The History of Parliament

|-

|-

1690s births
1760s missing person cases
1766 deaths
British Army generals
British Army personnel of the French and Indian War
British MPs 1741–1747
British MPs 1747–1754
British MPs 1754–1761
British MPs 1761–1768
Members of the Parliament of Great Britain for Appleby
Members of the Parliament of Great Britain for Carlisle
People lost at sea
Royal American Regiment officers
Royal Marines officers